Micractiniaceae is a family of green algae in the class Trebouxiophyceae. , AlgaeBase placed only the genus Phythelios in this family, and not the type genus Micractinium.

References

External links

Scientific references

Scientific databases
 AlgaTerra database
 Index Nominum Genericorum

Trebouxiophyceae
Trebouxiophyceae families